This is the discography of Flip Records, an American record label founded in April 1994 by Jordan Schur. The discography of Flip Records consists of 23 studio albums, 3 greatest hits albums, two extended plays and one remix album. Schur negotiated split 50/50 agreements with a variety of major labels to distribute the label's artists, including Interscope, Geffen, A&M, Elektra, Atlantic, Roadrunner and Epic.

The discography of Flip Records has sold a combined total of 70 million albums worldwide as of 2017. Limp Bizkit is Flip's best selling artist, having sold over 40 million albums worldwide whilst on the label.

Studio albums 
List of studio albums, with selected chart positions, sales figures and certifications (as of 2022)

See also 

 Flip Records (1994)

References 

Discographies of American record labels
Record label discographies